Cochlearia anglica is a species of flowering plant in the family Brassicaceae known by the common names English scurvygrass and long-leaved scurvy grass. It is a plant of the coastlines of Europe, especially the British Isles. It is edible, and as its name suggests, it is rich in vitamin C. It has spade-shaped leaves and white flowers.

References

Plants for a Future page
Photo

anglica
Flora of the United Kingdom
Plants described in 1759
Taxa named by Carl Linnaeus